The Audie Award for Young Adult Title is one of the Audie Awards presented annually by the Audio Publishers Association (APA). It awards excellence in narration, production, and content for a young adult audiobook intended for children ages 13 to 18 released in a given year. From 2009 to 2015 the award was given as the Audie Award for Teen Title. Before 2009 it was given as the Audie Award for Children's Title for Ages Twelve and Up. It has been awarded since 2007, when it was separated from the more expansive Audie Award for Children's Title for Ages Eight and Up.

Winners and finalists

2000s

2010s

2020s

References

External links 

 Audie Award winners
 Audie Awards official website

Young Adult Audiobook
Awards established in 2007
English-language literary awards